Chelan-e Olya (also Romanized as Chelān-e ‘Olyā; also known as Chelān) is a village in Sarajuy-ye Sharqi Rural District, Saraju District, Maragheh County, East Azerbaijan Province, Iran. At the 2006 census, its population was 619, in 121 families.

References 

Towns and villages in Maragheh County